Salmon House Falls is a waterfall at the confluence of the Takia and Dean Rivers at the western edge of the Interior Plateau, northwest of Tsitsutl Peak.

Asklhta was a Nuxalk village was located at this spot, which was known also as Salmon House.

References

Waterfalls of British Columbia
Interior Plateau
Landforms of the Chilcotin
Range 3 Coast Land District